Miguel Godoy may refer to:

 Miguel Godoy (footballer) (born 1983), Paraguayan footballer
 Miguel Godoy (basketball) (1907–2002), Peruvian basketball player